Novi reporter (New reporter) is a weekly news magazine based in Banja Luka, Bosnia and Herzegovina.

History and profile
Novi reporter was first published in March 2003. The founders of the magazine were a group of journalists who previously worked for the Banja Luka edition of now-defunct Reporter magazine which they left the magazine in February 2003. They were led by Igor Gajic and established a company, the OG Press, which is the owner of Novi reporter.

The headquarters of Novi reporter is in Banja Luka, and it is published weekly. The magazine has Bosnian, Croatian and Serbian editions.

Its content focuses on news and popular culture. Igor Gaic, its founder, also edits the magazine. Novi reporter has an independent stance, but supports the full independence of the Republika Srpska.

References

External links

2003 establishments in Bosnia and Herzegovina
Magazines established in 2003
Mass media in Banja Luka
Multilingual magazines
News magazines published in Europe
Political magazines
Weekly news magazines